David Nalbandian was the defending champion, but lost in the semifinals to Juan Mónaco.

Tommy Robredo won in the final 7–5, 2–6, 7–6(7–5), against Juan Mónaco.

Seeds

Draw

Finals

Top half

Bottom half

Qualifying

Seeds

Qualifiers

Draw

First qualifier

Second qualifier

Third qualifier

Fourth qualifier

References

External links
 Singles draw
 Qualifying Singles draw

Singles